Jason Robert Hervey (born April 6, 1972) is an American actor and television producer. He is best known for his role as Wayne Arnold on The Wonder Years.

Early life and acting
Hervey was born in Los Angeles, the son of Marsha, a talent agent, and Alan Hervey, a retail sales manager. In his early career, Hervey had small roles in films including Back to the Future, Pee-wee's Big Adventure, Meatballs Part II, Police Academy 2: Their First Assignment, and had a recurring role as Charlie in the final season of Diff'rent Strokes. His big break came as a cast member of the successful family dramedy, The Wonder Years, as the older brother of Fred Savage's character. He ranked at #71 on VH1's 100 Greatest Kid Stars for the role.

Hervey's role on The Wonder Years led to a later guest appearance on the animated show Justice League Unlimited. He appeared alongside Savage in the episode "Hawk and Dove", where Hervey provided the voice of the younger, more passive brother Don Hall/Dove, opposite Savage's role of the older and more aggressive brother, in a role reversal from The Wonder Years. The original idea had been to cast Hervey as Hawk in tribute to his role as Wayne Arnold, until both he and Savage felt the opposite roles were better challenges.

Hervey was the voice of Eddie McDowd on the Nickelodeon series 100 Deeds for Eddie McDowd for season two. He made a brief appearance in the 1993 adventure game Return to Zork as the troll king.

While post-Wonder Years acting credits were few and far between for Hervey, he did maintain ties to the entertainment industry as the producer of various sports-themed videos and specials (a substantial number of which were related to the World Championship Wrestling organization), a handful of television films, and a few television series. As the wave of 1980s nostalgia washed over the media in the early 2000s, Hervey became a frequent contributor to VH1's I Love the 80s and I Love the 80s Strikes Back and appeared as himself on reality shows such as Hogan Knows Best and Scott Baio Is 45...and Single.

Public relations
Hervey served as the Senior Vice President of Media and Communications for HealthSouth Corporation, based in Birmingham, Alabama. Hervey relocated to Birmingham to assume the post. He worked for the company from late 2001 until late 2003, during events that would lead to a fraud scandal. He later sued HealthSouth, demanding $300,000 in compensation.

Producing and game development
After a guest appearance on World Championship Wrestling television during his tenure on The Wonder Years, Hervey obtained a backstage position as an executive producer for WCW, which he held until the company's closure in 2001. During this time, he became friends with then-WCW Vice President Eric Bischoff, with whom he formed Bischoff Hervey Entertainment. Their company produced several sports and reality television shows, including I Want to Be a Hilton, Scott Baio Is 45...and Single, and Hulk Hogan's Celebrity Championship Wrestling, alongside Hogan. When Bischoff joined Total Nonstop Action Wrestling (TNA) in January 2010, Hervey also joined the promotion as an executive producer. He co-created the reality show TNA Reaction. Hervey appeared in a backstage segment with Eric Young on the June 16, 2011, edition of Impact Wrestling which was his last appearance.

In 2013, along with partners Eric Bischoff and Ike McFadden, Hervey formed the online gaming company MX Digital.  The company specializes in creating celebrity-themed online games, including games featuring David Hasselhoff and Hulk Hogan, among others.

Hervey is credited in The Eddie Guerrero Story: Cheating Death, Stealing Life for coming up with the idea for the Latino World Order (LWO).

Reality shows
Hervey appeared in an episode of Hogan Knows Best alongside Eric Bischoff, talking about energy drinks, and in several episodes of Scott Baio Is 45...and Single. In 2002, he made a brief appearance on the VH1 special I Love the '80s. Along with Baio, he co-hosts VH1's Confessions of a Teen Idol, a reality show in which former teen idols attempt to revitalize their entertainment careers. In February 2015, WGN premiered Bischoff/Hervey's latest production, Outlaw Country, a "reality crime drama" following two sets of brothers, one being on the criminal side of the law and the other being on the law enforcement side.

Filmography

References

External links
 

1972 births
20th-century American male actors
21st-century American male actors
Male actors from Los Angeles
American male child actors
American male film actors
American male television actors
American male voice actors
Television producers from California
Professional wrestling executives
Living people
University High School (Los Angeles) alumni